The archaeological excavations located on the outskirts of the city of Kurukshetra. Kurukshetra, District : Kurukshetra, Adjacent to Sheikh Chilli's Tomb,

The site spread over an area of 1 km x750 m within itself invaluable wealth of information in the form of a variety of historical remnants belonging to periods ranging from Kushan to Mughal era.

Excavation site 
This site was excavated by Shri B.M.Pandey of Archaeological Survey of India. has revealed antiquities related to at least six cultural and historical periods starting from first century AD to 19th,  A few painted 'Grey Ware' shreds were found in the pre-Kushana levels.

Associates with the post-Gupta period include polished redware. Several brick structures discovered from the mound also belong to these two periods. Some structural remnants of the Indo-Islamic period including a garden complex and some antiquities of various periods have also been found. Harsh Ka Tila can prove to be a happy hunting ground for archaeological enthusiasts.

The stairs inside might've been built later on, the Chamber in it is quite wide and spherical on the top. Just as compartments are created for horses in the stable, Delhi's zoo comprises a similar structure for the elephants.

Discovery 
The major discovery of the post-Gupta period is represented by brick structures associated with 'Red Polished Ware'  including a Mughal period garden complex on the Charbagh pattern.

Gallery

References 

Kurukshetra district
Archaeological artifacts
Archaeological sites in India